The White River Fauna are fossil animals found in the White River Badlands of South Dakota, Wyoming, Colorado and Nebraska in the United States including Badlands National Park.

The fossils have been found in the White River Formation, Chadron Formation, Brule Formation, and the Arikaree Formation.

Animals from the White River Badlands date from the Eocene, Oligocene, the Miocene, and the Pliocene Epochs.

List
Genera include:

See also
 :Category:White River Fauna

Further reading
 Rachel Benton, The White River Badlands: Geology and Paleontology, Indiana University Press 2015
 William Berryman Scott, A history of land mammals in the western hemisphere, MacMillan Publishing Company, 1913

References

 
Paleogene animals of North America
White River Formation, Fauna
White River Formation, Fauna
White River Formation, Fauna
White River Formation, Fauna
White River Formation, Fauna
White River Formation, Fauna
Paleontology lists